Naughty Stories for Good Boys and Girls (more commonly known simply as Naughty Stories) is a series of 13 books containing 4 short stories each about naughty children who learn a lesson at the end written by Christopher Milne. The stories are each around 5-10 pages long, and altogether, the 13 books have sold 550 000 copies worldwide and the first book has won the Young Australian's Best Book Award.

Series 
There are 13 books in the series, each with 4 stories, making a total of 52 stories.

Spinoffs 
There are also spinoffs of Naughty Stories (released by the same author):
The Naughty Nine
Scary Stories

References

Australian children's books
Series of children's books